Heritage Mall is a shopping center in Albany in the U.S. state of Oregon. Anchored by Hobby Lobby, Ross Dress For Less, and Target, the  mall opened in 1988.

History
A groundbreaking ceremony has held in August 1987, with the opening of the $21.5 million center expected in November 1988. The mall started with three anchor stores and plans for 60 to 70 other stores. Troutman's Emporium and J. C. Penney were announced as the first anchors to sign-up for the center in August 1987, with Target later becoming the third anchor. Robacor Associates and Roebbelen Land Company of California developed Heritage Mall.

The owners of the center filed for bankruptcy in December 1994, still owing $9.16 million to the contractors who built the mall. In August 2005, Heritage Mall was sold to Steadfast Commercial Properties of California for $34 million. Gottschalks opened a store at Heritage in 2005, which closed in 2009. At the time Gottschalks opened, other anchors were Target, Sears, Ross Dress for Less, and Old Navy. The mall was remodeled in 2006. The center was sold by Jones Lang LaSalle in December 2012 to Vintage Real Estate. In May 2013, Hobby Lobby announced plans to open its first store in Oregon in the former Gottschalks space.

In October 2014, Sears announced that it would close its store in the mall in early 2015.

See also
List of shopping malls in Oregon

References

Shopping malls in Oregon
Buildings and structures in Albany, Oregon
Shopping malls established in 1988
1988 establishments in Oregon